This is a list of recordings by actress and singer Sutton Foster.

Albums
 Wish, 2009, Ghostlight Records (solo debut album)
 An Evening with Sutton Foster: Live at the Café Carlyle, 2011, Ghostlight Records
 Take Me to the World, 2018

Cast albums
The Scarlet Pimpernel (original Broadway cast recording),1998
Thoroughly Modern Millie (original Broadway cast recording), 2002
Little Women (original Broadway cast recording), 2005
The Drowsy Chaperone (original Broadway cast recording), 2006
Young Frankenstein (original Broadway cast recording), 2007
Shrek the Musical (original Broadway cast recording), 2009
Anything Goes (2nd Broadway revival cast recording), 2011
Grammy Award nomination for Best Musical Theatre Album
Violet (original Broadway cast recording), 2014
The Music Man (2nd Broadway revival cast recording), 2022

Featured recordings
Jule Styne in Hollywood
The Maury Yeston Songbook
Keys - The Music of Scott Alan
A Merry Little Christmas, 2018

References

Foster, Sutton
Pop music discographies